The 1987–88 Scottish Premier Division season was won by Celtic, ten points ahead of Heart of Midlothian. Due to a league contraction to ten teams Falkirk, Dunfermline Athletic and Morton were relegated.

Table

Results

Matches 1–22
During matches 1-22 each team plays every other team twice (home and away).

Matches 23–44
During matches 23-44 each team plays every other team twice (home and away).

See also 
Rangers F.C. 2–2 Celtic F.C. (1987)

References
Statto

Scottish Premier Division seasons
1
Scot